Pure Cult is the first of several greatest hits compilations by the British rock band The Cult, released in 1993. The title of the original release was Pure Cult: for Rockers, Ravers, Lovers, and Sinners while the 2000 reissue was titled Pure Cult: The Singles 1984–1995.

Background
Released on 1 February 1993. Singer Ian Astbury and guitarist Billy Duffy admitted that they did not have high hopes for this record's release, thinking it would be of interest only to collectors and die hard fans. However, the first week of release it was number one on the British charts and went double platinum, selling over 200,000 copies, which led to it being issued later in several other countries in Europe (where it reportedly reached number one also in Portugal) and Asia.

Released in many forms, either as a single cd compilation of all work up to 1993 or as a double cd with a "Live" disc from a recording at the Marquee Club in November 1991. A four album boxset version included the full greatest hits compilation and live set (but omitting the "amplification breakdown" portion) from the Marquee show, or as a double album containing only the greatest hits compilation. In Poland it was released as a two-cassette tape set, with slightly different artwork, as Pure Cult - For Rockers, Ravers, Lovers, and Sinners, Volumes One and Two.

Some of the various pressings released were:
In the UK, a two-LP set, consisting of the greatest hits compilation.
Also in the UK, a four LP box set, consisting of the greatest hits compilation (with the full seven-minute version of "The Witch") and the two LP version of the Marquee Club show, minus the amplification breakdown section.
Another UK release was a two-CD set, the first disc is the greatest hits compilation (with the four minute version of "The Witch") and the second disc is the first half of the Marquee Club.
In Portugal and Brazil, it was released as a two-LP set, consisting of the greatest hits compilation.
In Italy and the Netherlands, it was released as a single cd greatest hits compilation, and also some copies included the second "Live at the Marquee Club" disc. Both versions in Italy and the Netherlands use the four minute version of "The Witch".
In Poland, it was issued as a two-cassette tape set, with the entire greatest hits compilation and the four minute version of "The Witch", but none of the live album. This version was an unauthorised release.
In the Philippines, it was issued as a single cassette tape with the entire greatest hits compilation, with the four minute version of "The Witch". It was also reissued on cassette tape again at a later date in the Philippines.
In Canada, two versions were released on cd, one by Polygram and the other by Beggars Banquet Records. Both versions were nearly identical, except the Polygram version used white lettering on the back cover, whereas and the Beggars Banquet version uses black lettering on the back cover.

Track listing (original release)
All compositions by Ian Astbury and Billy Duffy. (See also Pure Cult: The Singles 1984 - 1995).

"She Sells Sanctuary"
"Fire Woman"
"Lil' Devil"
"Spiritwalker"
"The Witch"*
"Revolution"**
"Wild Hearted Son"**
"Love Removal Machine"
"Rain"
"Edie (Ciao Baby)"**
"Heart of Soul"**
"Love"
"Wild Flower"
"Go West (Crazy Spinning Circles)"
"Resurrection Joe"**
"Sun King"
"Sweet Soul Sister"**
"Earth Mofo"

*(4:18 on CD, 7:03 on vinyl only)
**(Single version)

The Marquee show
(See also Live Cult).

Part 1
"Nirvana"
"Lil' Devil"
"Spiritwalker"
"Horse Nation"
"Zap City"
"Brother Wolf Sister Moon"
"Revolution"
"Love"
"Rain"

Part 2
"The Phoenix"
"Wild Flower"
"She Sells Sanctuary"
"Full Tilt"
"Amplification Breakdown" (Only on CD version)
"Peace Dog"
"Love Removal Machine"
"Earth Mofo"
"Fire Woman"

Charts

Weekly charts

Year-end charts

Certifications

References

1993 greatest hits albums
The Cult albums
Beggars Banquet Records compilation albums